Slide on Live: Plugged in and Standing is the first solo live album by Ronnie Wood. It was recorded at The Ritz in New York, at the Avalon in Boston and at the Budokan in Tokyo. The album peaked at #89 in Japan selling over 4,000 copies. The title is a play on Rod Stewart's unplugged album, Unplugged...and Seated on which Wood featured.

Track listing 
 "Testify" (George Clinton, Deron Taylor)
 "Josephine" (Ronnie Wood, Bernard Fowler)
 "Pretty Beat Up" (Mick Jagger, Keith Richards, Ronnie Wood)
 "Am I Grooving You" (Bert Russell, Jeff Barry)
 "Flying" (Ronnie Wood, Rod Stewart, Ronnie Lane)
 "Breathe on Me" (Ronnie Wood)
 "Silicone Grown" (Ronnie Wood, Rod Stewart)
 "Seven Days" (Bob Dylan)
 "Show Me" (Jerry Williams)
 "Show Me (Groove)" (Jerry Williams)
 "I Can Feel the Fire" (Ronnie Wood)
 "Slide Inst."
 "Stay With Me" (Ronnie Wood, Rod Stewart)

Personnel 
 Ronnie Wood - vocals, guitar, harmonica
 Johnny Lee Schell - guitar
 Shaun Solomon - bass
 Bernard Fowler - vocals
 Ian McLagan - keyboards
 Chuck Leavell - additional keyboards on "Testify", "Am I Grooving You", "Seven Days" and "Show Me (Groove)"
 Wayne P. Sheehy - drums

Ronnie Wood albums
1993 live albums